Eerie, Indiana is an American horror science fiction television series that originally aired on NBC from September 15, 1991, to December 9, 1993. The series was created by José Rivera and Karl Schaefer, with Joe Dante serving as creative consultant.

A total of nineteen episodes were produced. The final episode aired for the first time in 1993, when the series was syndicated on The Disney Channel. The show was rerun on The Disney Channel from October 7, 1993 to late March 1996. In 1997, the show generated a new fan base, when the Fox Kids Network aired the series on Saturday mornings from January to September, gaining something of a cult following despite its short run. The renewed popularity of the series encouraged Fox Kids to produce a spin-off Eerie, Indiana: The Other Dimension, lasting only one season in 1998.

Overview
The series revolves around Marshall Teller, a teenager whose family moves to the desolate town of Eerie, Indiana, population of 16,661. While moving into his new home, he meets Simon Holmes, one of the few normal people in Eerie. Together, they are faced with bizarre scenarios, which include discovering a sinister group of intelligent dogs that are planning on taking over the world, and meeting a tornado hunter who is reminiscent of Captain Ahab. They also confront numerous urban legends such as Bigfoot and a still-living Elvis Presley. Although the show was host to a plethora of jokes, it also featured a serious tone.

After thirteen episodes, one of which did not air during the network run, the series was retooled with Jason Marsden's "Dash X" added to the cast and Archie Hahn's Mr. Radford revealed to be an imposter, with John Astin revealed as the "actual" Mr. Radford. The final produced episode was a tongue-in-cheek, fourth-wall-breaking sequence of events depicting Dash X's attempts to take over as star of the show.

Characters

Main
 Marshall Teller, played by Omri Katz, is the protagonist of the series. With the help of his sidekick and best friend, Simon Holmes, he manages to unravel the many mysteries that plague Eerie, Indiana. Before moving to Eerie, Indiana, he and his family once lived in a large city, which he preferred. Though occasionally arrogant, Marshall is also intelligent, resourceful and quick-thinking, qualities that come in handy during his investigations. He is sometimes torn between hanging out with Simon and following his burgeoning instincts about girls. Marshall constantly compares Eerie to where he grew up in New Jersey, which is the epitome of 'normal' in his mind. He is a fan of the New York Giants.
 Simon Holmes, played by Justin Shenkarow, is Marshall's nine-year-old best friend. Due to the constant arguing between Simon's parents, he chooses to spend most of his free time hanging out with Marshall. Prior to Marshall's arrival, Simon was a lonely child, as most of his peers in Eerie shun him. Similar to Marshall, Simon believes that something is afoul in Eerie. In the episode "America's Scariest Home Video", it is revealed that Simon has a younger brother, Harley Schwarzenegger Holmes, who only appeared in that episode.
 Edgar Teller, played by Francis Guinan, is Marshall's father. Edgar works at "Things Incorporated", a product testing company, for a living. According to Marshall, it was Edgar's idea to leave New Jersey, and move to Eerie. During the course of the series, it is revealed that Edgar interned at the Smithsonian Institution before  entering  the Syracuse University to do his undergraduate work in archaeology. He later received a scholarship from NASA to attend M.I.T., where he worked on his thesis, "Matter: What is it Exactly?". As Edgar is a scientist, many fans believe that his name was a subtle nod towards Edward Teller, an American nuclear physicist who helped develop the hydrogen bomb.
 Marilyn Teller, played by Mary-Margaret Humes, is Marshall's mother. Marilyn operates her own party planning business at the Eerie Mall. Ironically, as shown in "Forever Ware", Marilyn is not an organised person. In episode "Who's Who", she is briefly adopted as a mother by Sara Bob, who is trying to create a perfect family.
 Syndi Marie Priscilla Teller, played by Julie Condra, is Marshall's older sister. At the time in which Marshall introduces Syndi to the audience, she is practicing for her drivers license test. Marshall often ridicules his sister for the awkward spelling of her name. Syndi aims to be a reporter and spends time with the Eerie police and fire department to gain experience. "The Loyal Order of Corn" is the only episode where Syndi does not appear.
 Dash X, played by Jason Marsden, is a character shrouded in mystery. First introduced in the episode "The Hole in the Head Gang", Dash claims that he woke up in "Weirdsville" without any knowledge to how he got there. Dash has no memory of parents, hometown, past or his real name. Since Dash has no home, he is forced to live on the streets and eat out of Dumpsters. Dash is commonly referred to as "The Kid with the Grey Hair". People would later go on to call him the "Sneaky Kid with the Hair" and "The Kid with No Name". On some occasions, Dash would help Marshall and Simon solve some of Eerie's mysteries, most notably by helping them infiltrate the Loyal Order of Corn cult. Dash X gave himself his name in the episode "The Loyal Order of the Corn", as a reference to the mysterious '-' and '+' markings on his hands which were shared by the extraterrestrial leader of the cult. Dash X wonders if the cult leader, played by Ray Walston is his father, but the leader ruefully and cryptically remarks, "If only it were simple as that," before returning to his homeworld.

Recurring
 Mr. Radford (the imposter – revealed as Fred Suggs)  – (Archie Hahn)
 Mr. Radford (the real one) – (John Astin)
 Winifred Swanson and Mother – (Belinda Balaski)
 Sergeant Knight – (Harry Goaz)
 Mayor Winston Chisel – (Gregory Itzin)
 The Anchorman – (Doug Llewelyn)
 Elvis Presley – (Steven Peri)
 Bertram Wilson – (Nathan Schultz) (Dan Stanton – adult)
 Ernest Wilson – (Nicholas Schultz) (Don Stanton – adult)
 Harley Schwarzenegger Holmes – (Christian and Joseph Cousins)
 Lodgepoole – (Henry Gibson)

Production

Writing
Each episode was strewn with in-jokes and references to old films, particularly horror films:

 In the episode "Heart on a Chain", a scene begins with a shot of spider web before panning right to action taking place. Whilst looking at the spider web, one can faintly hear a high-pitched voice crying "Help me! Help me!", a sly reference to the 1958 version of The Fly. Also in this episode, Marshall's creepy English teacher is called Miss Annabel Lee, a reference to the morbid Edgar Allan Poe poem of the same name. Right at the end of the episode, the Grim Reaper is seen in the background.
 In the episode "Mr. Chaney", Marshall meets a werewolf that, while in human form, goes by the name of "Mr. Chaney", a nod to Lon Chaney, Jr. who played the title role in the 1941 version of The Wolf Man. In this same episode, there is a reference to the 1981 film The Howling, a film about werewolves directed by Joe Dante, himself an occasional director of the show. There is also a mention of David Lynch's TV show Twin Peaks with Marshall exclaiming at one point 'It's you!' and the Grey Haired Kid, holding a log with which he just hit Mr. Chaney, replying 'Well, it ain't the Log Lady.'
 In the episode "Just Say No Fun", the name of the school is B. F. Skinner Middle School in reference to the eponymous psychologist.
 In the episode "America's Scariest Home Video", an actor from a classic mummy movie is transported into the Teller home. The actor's name is Boris Von Orloff, a reference to Boris Karloff, who played the title role in the 1932 film, The Mummy.
 In the episode "The Retainer", the  orthodontist's name is Dr. Eukanuba, a reference to the dog food brand and the episode's plot about evil dogs.
 In the episode "No Brain, No Pain", a leather clad woman with sunglasses utters, "I'll be back", before hastily leaving Marshall and his friends. Her appearance and quote reminisces Arnold Schwarzenegger's role as The Terminator. She was also referred to as "Mrs. Terminator" by one of the boys. Incidentally Simon's little brother's middle name is "Schwarzenegger". Additionally, an instrumental variation of the song "My Sharona" is played during portions of the episode, while the song is referenced several times. Marshall's family eats at the Dragon of the Black Pool Chinese restaurant, a direct reference to the film Big Trouble in Little China.
 In the episode "Reality Takes a Holiday" Marshall says, "I don't have a dog named Toto. But, if I did, right about now I'd be telling him – Toto, I don't think we're in Indiana any more", a reference to The Wizard of Oz. Later in the episode, Dash X says, "he's the kind of guy who actually believes that there's no place like home".
 In the first episode, "Forever Ware'"  Marshall says, "Dad's job is one of the reasons we moved here, because, statistically speaking, Eerie's the most normal place in the entire country". This is a reference to the Middletown studies which served as a sociological case study of Muncie, Indiana in the 1920s and 1930s. Several references are also made to the popular children's show Sesame Street. For example, the two twin boys are named Bertram and Ernest, or Bert and Ernie for short.
 Also in the first episode, Marshall jokes "Where's Donna Reed when you need her?" This is a reference to The Donna Reed Show where Reed played the typical 1950s housewife and foreshadows the arrival of Betty Wilson, whose look and characterisation are heavily inspired by said show. Donna Reed also played the grandmother of Omri Katz's character in Dallas between 1984 and 1985.

Episodes
A total of nineteen episodes of Eerie, Indiana were produced before the show's cancellation. The episode "The Broken Record" was the only episode which did not air before the show's retooling and was omitted during the show's initial run on NBC. The episode aired for the first time on television when the series was syndicated on The Disney Channel in 1993.

The show's producers planned to make an episode entitled "The Jolly Rogers", which featured a group of pirates in search for buried treasure in the Teller house.

*  "The Hole in the Head Gang" is the first episode in which the episode titles are shown on screen.

Reception

Eerie, Indiana was well received by critics when it debuted on television. Entertainment Weekly gave it a "B" rating and Ken Tucker wrote "You watch Eerie for the small-screen spectacle of it all—to see the way, in the show's first few weeks, feature-film directors like Joe Dante (Gremlins) and Tim Hunter (River's Edge) oversaw episodes that summoned up an atmosphere of absurdist suburban dread."

In his review for The Hollywood Reporter, Miles Beller wrote "Scripted by Karl Schaefer and José Rivera with smart, sharp insights; slyly directed by feature film helmsman Joe Dante; and given edgy life by the show's winning cast, Eerie, Indiana shapes up as one of the fall season's standouts, a newcomer that has the fresh, bracing look of Edward Scissorhands and scores as a clever, wry presentation well worth watching." In his review for the Orange County Register, Ray Richmond wrote "It's the kind of knowingly hip series with equally strong appeal for both kids and adults, the kind that preteens will watch and discuss."

USA Today described the show as "Stephen King by way of The Simpsons", and Matt Roush wrote "Eerie recalls Edward Scissorhands and even—heaven help it—David Lynch in its garish nightmare-comedy depiction of the lurid and silly horrors that lurk beneath suburban conformity." In his review for The Washington Times, David Klinghoffer wrote "Everything about the pilot exceeds the normal minimal expectations of TV. Mr. Dante directs as if he were making a movie, and a good one. In a departure from usual TV operating procedures, he sometimes actually has more than one thing going on on screen at the same time!"

Broadcast history
In the UK, Eerie, Indiana was shown on Channel 4 from March to July 1993.

In 2012, the entire series was added to the Hulu website.

Reruns of the series began in August 2012 on the now-defunct Fearnet, airing weekend mornings on their "Funhouse" block.

As of 2022, the series is available to stream on Amazon Freevee.

Spin-off series

In 1997, the show generated a new fan base, when Fox's children's programming block Fox Kids aired the series. The following year, a spin-off series was produced entitled, Eerie, Indiana: The Other Dimension. The series was filmed in Canada and focused on another, younger boy while still following the concept of the original show. The spin-off lasted one season. The first episode of the spin-off, "Switching Channels", features a crossover between the two shows via a TV set.

Home media
On October 12, 2004, Alpha Video released Eerie, Indiana: The Complete Series on DVD in Region 1. The 5-disc box set features all nineteen episodes of the original series.

In other media

Books
Following the show's "re-birth" on Fox in 1997, authors Michael Thomas Ford, Sherry Shahan, Jeremy Roberts, John Peel and Robert James wrote a number of in-universe paperback books relating to Eerie, Indiana. The books featured new stories, which helped expand the Eerie universe. Similar to the television series, the books focused on Marshall and Simon, as they continue to solve various perplexing phenomena in Eerie.

Titles
Return to Forever Ware (Mike Ford) (October 1997) : Marshall and Simon get jobs cleaning a strange couple's basement out and discover that they were Forever Ware representatives and also used the infamous Tupperware to keep themselves young.
Bureau of Lost (John Peel) (October 1997) : Eerie's Bureau of Lost suffers a power failure, and all of history's famous figures who went missing and/or died under mysterious circumstances (Jesse James, Butch Cassidy, The Sundance Kid, Amelia Earhart, among others) are on the loose and planning to commit crimes.
The Eerie Triangle (Mike Ford) (October 1997) : Marshall and Simon try to solve the mystery of why Eerie, Indiana's town founder is not mentioned in the history books and if it has anything to do with a possible alien invasion cover-up in the 1950s.
Simon and Marshall's Excellent Adventure (John Peel) (November 1997) : Simon and Marshall suspect a new boy, Jazen, who seems to disappear into thin air as he is about to be caught, of being a time traveler.
Have Yourself an Eerie Little Christmas (Mike Ford) (December 1997) : Marshall and Simon find themselves in a Dickensian London town on Christmas Eve—and discover that they are trapped inside a snow globe and will remain so unless they can find a way out.
Fountain of Weird (Sherry Shahan) (January 1998) : Marshall and Simon find themselves at the Old Fogey's Farm, run by Dr. Beelzebug, who has discovered a way to stop people from aging. But he uses hormones from young people to do it—and he plans for the boys to be his next donors.
Attack of the Two-Ton Tomatoes (Mike Ford) (February 1998) : Everyone in Eerie begins eating a new line of super-juicy, super-big vegetables to get healthy, but Marshall and Simon soon find that the produce is turning the people into plant monsters.
Who Framed Alice Prophet? (Mike Ford) (March 1998) : A mysterious painting leads Marshall and Simon on the trail of an artist who makes her paintings too real.
Bring Me a Dream (Robert James) (March 1998) : When anything the Tellers dream of is delivered to Marshall's door, it's fun at first—until the delivery van starts leaving nightmares.
Finger-Lickin' Strange (Jeremy Roberts) (May 1998) : The new chef at World o' Stuff's lunch counter is a sensation: everybody raves about her cooking, but Marshall and Simon discover why the new chef's lunch leaves people wanting more.
The Dollhouse That Time Forgot (Mike Ford) (June 1998) : Syndi and Mrs. Teller just love the old dollhouse they found at a yard sale, but Marshall and Simon aren't impressed. Still, when they see an interesting doll in a shop window, they make it a present for Syndi. But when Syndi puts the doll into the house, weirdness ensues. And when Marshall sneaks into a real-life house that looks like the dollhouse, he realizes that he's shrinking. What's the connection between all this and the peculiar new girl in school who looks just like Syndi's doll? 
They Say (Mike Ford) (July 1998) : Marshall and Simon help an old woman who tells them about The Gathering of They, a secret society behind the myriad of generalizations, advice, and superstitions in society.
Switching Channels (Mike Ford) (August 1998) : In an adaptation of the series premiere of Eerie, Indiana: The New Dimension, two boys named Mitchell and Stanley find their television tuned into another dimension, where two boys named Marshall and Simon are looking for a portal into another reality.
The Incredible Shrinking Stanley (Robert James) (September 1998) : Stanley and Mitchell go to the Eerie Laundromat after Stanley's washer breaks, but when Stanley comes in contact with the laundromat's soaps and powders, he begins to shrink, and unless Mitchell can fix it, Stanley will continue to grow small until he vanishes.
Halloweird (Mike Ford) (October 1998) : Mitchell's dad is planning a special Halloween show on radio station WERD, a spooky story about invaders from Mars. Then Mitchell and Stanley find some terrific costumes at a local shop, and offer to help the proprietor organize a Halloween parade in return for letting them use the costumes for Halloween, unaware that they are about to get caught up in the weirdest adventure of all. Because some of the people in Eerie aren't really people—and Dad's radio show might just turn out to be true.
Eerie in the Mirror (by Robert James) (November 1998) : Stanley and Mitchell accidentally break a mirror, but, rather than seven years' bad luck, the mirror creates an inverted reality of Eerie, Indiana. Can Mitchell and Stanley set things right without coming in contact with their inverted selves?
We Wish You an Eerie Christmas (Robert James) (December 1998) : When the Tellers find themselves on the verge of losing their home, Mitchell's Christmas cheer turns sour, and only the Ghosts of Christmas Past, Present, and Not-So-Far-Into-The-Future can help him.

Legacy
Alex Hirsch cited the series as an influence on his own Gravity Falls series.

References

External links 

1990s American horror television series
1990s American mystery television series
1990s American science fiction television series
1991 American television series debuts
1993 American television series endings
English-language television shows
Fictional populated places in Indiana
NBC original programming
Television series about families
Television series about teenagers
Television shows set in Indiana